Lophoptera litigiosa is a member of the moth family Noctuidae.

It is found in most countries of subtropical Africa, from Sierra Leone to South Africa; Nigeria to Kenya, including the islands of the Indian Ocean of Madagascar, Mauritius and La Réunion.

This species has a wingspan of 19mm.

References 

Boisduval, 1833. Faune entomologique de Madagascar, Bourbon et Maurice. Lépidoptères. Avec des notes sur les moeurs, par M. Sganzin. - — :1–122, pls. 1–16

Stictopterinae
Moths described in 1833
Moths of Africa
Moths of Madagascar
Moths of Réunion